Nuquí is a municipality and town in the Chocó Department, Colombia. The municipality of Nuquí is located in the department of Chocó in the Western part of Colombia between the mountainous area of Baudó and the Pacific Ocean. Nuquí has a great cultural diversity as well as a big variety of flora and fauna.
Nuquí has 8096 inhabitants, 3095 of which live in the municipal capital. The majority of the population are Afro-Colombians, another part of the population is represented by members of indigenous tribes.
Nuquí was founded as a municipality in 1915, before it was a sub-division of the municipality Valle, Chocó.

Nuquí is served by the Reyes Murillo Airport.

Villages of the municipality of Nuquí 
 Arusí (Touristic)
 Coquí (Touristic)
 Joví (Touristic)
 Jurubirá
 Panguí
 Termales (Touristic)
 Tribugá

Economy 
 Fishing
 Small-scale livestock farming and agriculture (banana, rice, cacao, corn, coconut, yuca and other tubers).
 Tourism: Ecotourism and community-based tourism. The municipality contains part of the Utría National Natural Park.

Tourism sites 
 Hot springs
 Beaches of Coqui
 Mangrove forests of Coquí for tours in canoes
 River of Joví for river tours
 Guachalito
 Surfing zones: Playa Olímpica, Guachalito near Terquito beach

Climate
Nuquí has a very wet tropical rainforest climate (Af) with very heavy rainfall year-round.

References

External links

Municipalities of Chocó Department
Underwater diving sites in Colombia
Road-inaccessible communities of Colombia